= Canoeing at the 2010 South American Games – Men's K-1 1000 metres =

The Men's K-1 1000m event at the 2010 South American Games was held over March 27 at 9:40.

== Medalists ==
Gold	Silver	Bronze
Daniel Alfredo dal Bo; Argentina	João Rodrigues; Brazil	Yojan Cano; Colombia

== Results ==
Rank	Athlete	Time
1st place, gold medalist(s)	Daniel Alfredo dal Bo (ARG)	3:43.32
2nd place, silver medalist(s)	João Rodrigues (BRA)	3:44.99
3rd place, bronze medalist(s)	Yojan Cano (COL)	3:48.49
4	Ray Rene Acuna (VEN)	3:50.47
5	Christian Albert Oyarzun (ECU)	3:54.83
6	Juan Carlos Estrada (BOL)	4:10.54
7	Martin Perez (URU)	4:22.15
